Interfolio is an academic faculty management software and higher education technology company based in Washington, D.C.  The company provides software to assist shared governance processes and faculty activity tracking tools to assist with institutional accreditation and reporting. In January 2016, the company acquired $12 million in investor funding.

Foundation and services

Interfolio was founded by Georgetown University senior Steve Goldenberg in 1999. Interfolio’s services represents a complete faculty lifecycle and information system. Interfolio was created to streamline the college application process for academic jobs by providing an online portfolio and application system. Principal Interfolio services includes Dossier, a service for collecting, curating, and delivering academic materials to scholarly opportunities. Interfolio based a module for faculty information that includes a workflow and evaluation suite, as well as a tool for faculty activity reporting.

Controversy

In March of 2022, Interfolio subsidiary Researchfish was accused of attempting to threaten or intimidate academics who criticised the company or its products online. Some academics have raised concerns that the company may have violated UK General Data Protection Regulations by accessing the protected data it collects to identify and target its online critics.

Notable partners
 Inside Higher Ed
 American Sociological Association
 Princeton University
 American Historical Association
 University of California, Los Angeles

References 

1999 establishments in Washington, D.C.
Database management systems
Educational software
School-administration software